Gian Paolo Lomazzo (26 April 1538 – 27 January 1592; his first name is sometimes also given as "Giovan" or "Giovanni") was an Italian artist and writer on art. Praised as a painter, Lomazzo wrote about artistic practice and art theory after blindness compelled him to pursue a different professional path by 1571. Lomazzo's written works were especially influential to second generation Mannerism in Italian art and architecture.

Early life

Gian Paolo Lomazzo was born in Milan from a family who had emigrated from the town of Lomazzo. His early training was with Giovan Battista della Cerva in Milan. He painted a large Allegory of the Lenten Feast for San Agostino in Piacenza (1567). Other works by his hand include an elaborate dome with Glory of Angels for the Capella Foppa in San Marco in Milan, and the Fall of Simon Magus in the wall of the chapel.

Lomazzo was depicted on a ca. 1560 medal by Annibale Fontana that described him as having been introduced by Mercury to Fortune (commercial success).

Writings on art theory and criticism
Lomazzo became blind in 1571 and turned to writing, producing two complex treatises that are milestones in the development of art criticism. His first work, Trattato dell'arte della pittura, scoltura et architettura (1584), is divided into seven books: Proportion, Motion, Color, Light, Perspective, Practice, History, and iconography related to classical and Christian subjects.  Lomazzo offered a systematic codification of aesthetics was central to the development of Italian mannerist theories of art.  Lomazzo's first treatise was translated into English by British physician Richard Haydocke and published in 1596 as A Tracte Containing the Artes of Curious Paintinge, Carvinge & Buildinge (1596), which included new details about British artists. 

Lomazzo's more abstract Idea del tempio della pittura ("The ideal temple of painting", 1590) describes the "four temperaments" theory of human nature and personality and contains explanations about of the role of individuality in judgment and artistic invention.

Lomazzo's writings about art took into account three aspects of art criticism: doctrina, the record of discoveries— such as perspective— that artists had made in the course of history; prattica, the personal preferences and maniera of the artist, and iconography, the literary element in arts. Lomazzo's contribution to art criticism was his systematic extraction of abstract concepts from art, not merely a recounting of the marvels of verisimilitude and technique and anecdotes of the works' reception among contemporaries of the type that Giorgio Vasari had reported in the previous generation. 

David Piper quotes his influential views on portraiture: 

Giovanni Ambrogio Figino, Cristoforo Ciocca, and Girolamo Ciocca were his pupils.

Notes

References
Kemp, M.: 'Equal Excellences': Lomazzo And The Explanation of Individual Style in the Visual Arts, in Renaissance Studies vol 1.1, March 1987.
Lomazzo, Gian Paolo: Trattato dell'arte della pittura, scoltura et architettura [Milano 1584] in Scritti sulle arti Vol. II, Roberto Paolo Ciardi, Florence 1974.
Romano, G., Giovan paolo Lomazzo, in Gaudenzio Ferrari e la sua scuola: i cartoni cinquecenteschi dell'Accademia Albertina, Torino 1982
J. Lynch, Giovanni Paolo Lomazzo’s self portrait in the Brera, in «Gazette des Beaux Arts», LXIV, 1964, pp. 189 ss.
Manegold, C.: Wahrnehmung - Bild - Gedächtnis. Studien zur Rezeption der aristotelischen Gedächnistheorie in den kunsttheoretischen Schriften des Giovanni Paolo Lomazzo; Ph.D. thesis. Published as Studien zur Kunstgeschichte vol. 158; Olms 2004. . In German.
Lomazzo, G. P. Rabisch, edited by D. Isella, Torino 1993
Rabisch. Il grottesco nell’arte del Cinquecento. L’Accademia della Val di Blenio, Lomazzo e l’ambiente milanese, edited by M. Kahn-Rossi and F. Porzio, Milano 1998
Isella, D., Lombardia stravagante, Torino 2005

External links 

Vita of Gian Paolo Lomazzo.
Brief description (in Italian).
Another description,  (in Italian).
Lomazzo, Christ in the Garden of Gethsemane (Biblioteca Ambrosiana) An exercise in dramatic lighting of a nocturnal subject. (description in Italian).
Gian Paolo Lomazzo, "The composition of grotesques", Chapter 48 of the sixth book of Treatise on Painting, Sculpture, and Architecture (Trattato dell'arte della pittura, scoltura, et architettura). Milan, 1585.
Leonardo da Vinci, Master Draftsman, an exhibition catalog from The Metropolitan Museum of Art (fully available online as PDF), which contains material on Lomazzo (see index)
Painters of reality: the legacy of Leonardo and Caravaggio in Lombardy, an exhibition catalog from The Metropolitan Museum of Art (fully available online as PDF), which contains material on Lomazzo (see index)

1538 births
1592 deaths
16th-century Italian painters
Italian male painters
Painters from Milan
Italian Mannerist painters
Artist authors
Blind academics